Good Night, and Good Luck is a 2005 historical drama film directed by George Clooney, and starring David Strathairn, Patricia Clarkson, Clooney, Jeff Daniels, Robert Downey Jr. and Frank Langella. The film was co-written by Clooney and Grant Heslov, and portrays the conflict between veteran radio and television journalist Edward R. Murrow (Strathairn) and U.S. Senator Joseph McCarthy of Wisconsin, especially relating to the anti-Communist Senator's actions with the Senate Permanent Subcommittee on Investigations.

The film was a box office success and received critical acclaim. It was nominated for six Academy Awards, including Best Picture, Best Director and Best Actor for Strathairn.

Accolades

References

External links
 

Lists of accolades by film